Periclimenaeus perlatus is a species of shrimp of the family Palaemonidae. Periclimenaeus perlatus is found in the Gulf of Mexico.

References

Crustaceans described in 1930
Palaemonidae